Anila Amrutlal Dalal is Gujarati critic and translator.

Life
Dalal was born on 21 October 1933 in Ahmedabad to Amritlal Dalal. She completed SSC in 1949, BA in English in 1954, MA in English in 1956 and later Ph.D. from Gujarat University. She received MS from University of Illinois in 1959. She is a retired professor and Head of the Department of English at Sardar Vallabhbhai Patel Arts College, Ahmedabad where she taught from June 1960 to 1990s. She received PhD in 1990 from Gujarat University for her thesis on novels of Iris Murdoch.

Works
Ravindranath ane Sharatchandrana Katha Sahityama Nari (1979) is two parts work on criticism on females in works of Rabindranath Tagore and Sarat Chandra Chattopadhyay. The first part has seven articles on works of Tagore while second part has five articles on works of Chattopadhyay. Deshantar (1981) is a work on literature of several languages; German, Russian, Hebrew, French, Greek, Italian, Spanish and laureates; Ted Hughes, Harold Pinter, Philip Larkin, Bertolt Brecht, Alexander Solzhenitsyn, Iris Murdoch. Darpannu Nagar (1987), Manushi - Shityama Nari (1993), Navalkathama Chetanapravah (1994) and Nivedan (1999) are her other works of criticism.

She translated three Bengali novels of Sunil Gangopadhyay; Radhakrishna (1981), Aranyaman  Deen Raat (1983) and Pratidwandwi (1986). She translated Bimal Kar's Balika Vadhu (1989) and Prachhanna (1991) from Bengali. She translated Devesh Ray's Tistakanthanu Vrutant (1997). She also translated Mahabharata: Ek Aadhunik Drishtikon (1980) by Buddhadeb Bosu, Maharshi Devendranath Thakur (1980) by Narayan Chaudhary, Chaudhari, Laxminath Bejbarua (1985) by Hem Barua. She also translated several essays of Tagore in Ravindra Nibandhmala Part 2 (1976) and more than seventy songs of Tagore in Geet Panchshati (1978). She also translated letters of Tagore as Chinna Patra Marmar (1993). She also translated The Later Novels of Iris Murdoch (1993) from English. She translated Tarashankar Bandopadyay (1994) by Mahasweta Devi, Ravindra Sanchay, Vrindavan Morli Vage Chhe. She translated Rama Mehta's English novel Inside the Haveli as Havelini Andar (2003).

Awards
She received the Gujarati Sahitya Parishad award in 1994, the Gujarat Sahitya Academy award in 1994 and the Sahitya Akademi Translation Prize in 1993 for Prachhanna.

See also
 List of Gujarati-language writers

References 

1933 births
Living people
Women writers from Gujarat
Gujarati-language writers
Writers from Ahmedabad
Gujarati people
20th-century Indian translators
Indian literary critics
20th-century Indian women writers
Indian women critics
Indian women translators
Translators to Gujarati
Translators of Rabindranath Tagore
Recipients of the Sahitya Akademi Prize for Translation